Die Hölle muss warten (German for "Hell Must Wait") is the fifth studio album by German band Eisbrecher.

Track listing

Miststück 2012 edition
Bonus tracks

Miststück 2012 edition (DVD)

2016 Volle Kraft voraus Tour Gold Edition

Music videos
 "Verrückt"
 "Die Hölle muss warten"
 "Miststück 2012"

Charts and sales

Die Hölle muss warten has been certified gold after selling more than 100,000 copies across Germany as of January 2016.

References

Eisbrecher albums
2012 albums
German-language albums